Anselm McEvoy "Voy" Oxenham (20 July 1882 – c. 1919) was a rugby union player who represented Australia.

Oxenham, a prop, was born in Brisbane, Queensland and claimed a total of 2 international rugby caps for Australia. His debut game was against Great Britain, at Brisbane, on 23 July 1904.

References

Australian rugby union players
Australia international rugby union players
1882 births
Year of death missing
Rugby union players from Brisbane
Rugby union props